The 3rd constituency of the Yonne is a French legislative constituency in the Yonne département.

Description

Yonne's 3rd constituency covers the north west of the department around the small city of Sens.

Politically the seat was a strong hold of the Gaullist UMP until 2017.

Historic Representation

Election results

2022

 
 
|-
| colspan="8" bgcolor="#E9E9E9"|
|-
 
 

 
 
 
 
 

* Frantz stood as a dissident member of Horizons, without the support of the party or the Ensemble alliance.

2017

 
 
 
 
 
 
 
|-
| colspan="8" bgcolor="#E9E9E9"|
|-

2012

 
 
 
 
 
|-
| colspan="8" bgcolor="#E9E9E9"|
|-

2007

 
 
 
 
 
 
 
 
|-
| colspan="8" bgcolor="#E9E9E9"|
|-

2002

 
 
 
 
 
|-
| colspan="8" bgcolor="#E9E9E9"|
|-

1997

 
 
 
 
 
 
 
 
|-
| colspan="8" bgcolor="#E9E9E9"|
|-

Sources
Official results of French elections from 2002: "Résultats électoraux officiels en France" (in French).

3